StormGeo AS (formerly Storm Weather Center AS) was founded in 1997 and is one of the largest privately held weather service providers worldwide. It provides meteorological services, particularly to the offshore, renewable energy, shipping, corporate enterprise and media industries. The chief executive officer of Storm Geon is Søren Andersen.

History

Foundation
StormGeo started in 1997 as Storm Weather Center, a spin-off of Norway’s largest commercial broadcaster, TV2. Meteorologist Siri Kalvig saw an opportunity to offer customized weather services to other industries, and she began a venture in collaboration with TV2. In 1998, StormGeo created their first weather service for the growing hydroelectric power industry. They also reached into a broader oil and gas energy market. In August 2018, StormGeo was selected as a participant in the UN Global Compact, committing to ocean sustainability as a contributor to the Action Platform for Sustainable Ocean Business.

StormGeo is headquartered in Bergen, Norway, with 27 offices that are present across the globe including US, UK, UAE, Norway, Sweden, Netherlands, Greece, Azerbaijan, Germany, Hong Kong, Oman, Brazil, Denmark, South Korea, China, Singapore, Taiwan, Japan and Lithuania and 550 employees. Its seven global weather support centers operate every time across the globe.

Acquisitions
In 2011, StormGeo expanded its operation into the Middle East with the acquisition of the Dubai-based weather forecasting company Met Consultancy FZ LLC. Met Consultancy was the largest commercial weather technology company in the Middle East and was founded in 2004 by Daniel Mathew. In 2012, the Houston-based ImpactWeather Inc. became a part of StormGeo. ImpactWeather was a leading provider of weather monitoring, forecasting and alerting for offshore and onshore corporate businesses in the US.

StormGeo acquired Applied Weather Technology, Inc. headquartered in Silicon Valley, California in 2014. AWT provides weather and route forecasting for the shipping industry with offices in North America, Europe and Asia.

In 2016, StormGeo acquired Nena Analysis, an analysis house that delivers energy market insights, such as price prognoses and market analysis to major utilities and trading entities. This acquisition allowed these analyses to include weather data as a fundamental input component.

In 2018, StormGeo acquired Nautisk, a global supplier of maritime charts and publications to the merchant marine. This acquisition made StormGeo the first company to integrate routing and weather services with charts and publications solutions.

In February 2019, StormGeo acquired 51% of Grupo Climatempo, the leading company in meteorological services in Brazil. This addition positioned StormGeo to expand further into Brazil, as well as across all of Latin America.

Shareholders
From June 2021 StormGeo is fully owned by Alfa Laval.

References

Meteorological companies
Companies based in Bergen
Privately held companies of Norway
Companies established in 1997
Norwegian companies established in 1997